Harry Owen "Dick" Bayless  (September 6, 1885 – December 16, 1920) was a professional baseball player.  He was an outfielder for one season (1908) with the Cincinnati Reds. He played in the minor leagues through 1917. He died three years later in a copper mine explosion in Santa Rita, New Mexico.

References

1883 births
1920 deaths
Cincinnati Reds players
Major League Baseball outfielders
Baseball players from Missouri
Minor league baseball managers
Springfield Reds players
Springfield Midgets players
Joplin Miners players
Wichita Jobbers players
Dayton Veterans players
Atlanta Crackers players
Mobile Sea Gulls players
Vernon Tigers players
Memphis Chickasaws players
Venice Tigers players
Salt Lake City Bees players
Lincoln Links players
People from Joplin, Missouri
People from Santa Rita, New Mexico
Industrial accident deaths
Deaths from explosion
Accidental deaths in New Mexico